1990 in philosophy

Events

Publications 
 Giorgio Agamben, The Coming Community (published in Italian as La comunità che viene in 1990; English translation: 1993)
 Ray Kurzweil, The Age of Intelligent Machines (1990)
 Judith Butler, Gender Trouble (1990)
 Jonathan Lear, Love and Its Place in Nature: A Philosophical Interpretation of Freudian Psychoanalysis (1990)

Deaths 
 January 26 - Lewis Mumford (born 1895)
 August 1 - Norbert Elias (born 1897)
 August 4 - Norman Malcolm (born 1911)
 August 18 - B. F. Skinner (born 1904)
 October 22 - Louis Althusser (born 1918) 
 November 24 - Keiji Nishitani (born 1900)

References 

Philosophy
20th-century philosophy
Philosophy by year